Sacré bleu, an alternative spelling of Sacrebleu, may refer to:
Sacre Bleu Cross, a theatrical cartoon of the 1960s' The Inspector series 
Sacré Blues, a book by Taras Grescoe
"Sacre Bleu", a song by The Balham Alligators
Sacré Bleu, a novel by Christopher Moore